East Glebe is a bus rapid transit station in Alexandria, Virginia, located on Richmond Highway (U.S. Route 1) between East Glebe Road and Hume Avenue. It is a stop on the portion of dedicated bus-only highway along the Metroway bus rapid transit line, providing two-way service along the route. The station provides service to the central Potomac Yard and Potomac communities in Alexandria.

The southbound station is located at the northern end of the busway that runs down the median of Richmond Highway, but the northern station is in mixed-traffic on East Glebe Road, one block east at Main Line Boulevard.

History 
East Glebe opened to the public as one of the original Metroway stations; the station opened for service on August 24, 2014.

Station layout
This diagram shows the layout of the station in the median busway.

References

External links
 Official Metroway site

Buildings and structures in Alexandria, Virginia
Metroway
2014 establishments in Virginia
Transport infrastructure completed in 2014
Bus stations in Virginia